644 Cosima is a minor planet orbiting the Sun.

References

External links
 
 

Background asteroids
Cosima
Cosima
S-type asteroids (Tholen)
19070907